Archeparchy of Homs may refer to:

 Melkite Greek Catholic Archeparchy of Homs
 Syrian Catholic Archeparchy of Homs